Hayuliang is a town and the headquarters of an eponymous subdivision in the Anjaw district in the north-eastern state of Arunachal Pradesh, India. It is on the bank of the Lohit River near the confluence of the Delei River.

The Hayuliang subdivision, administered by an additional divisional commissioner (ADC), covers the entire Delei River basin including the Hayuliang Circle, Metengliang Circle, Goiliang Circle and the Chaglagam Circle. It is divided into two community development blocks, the Hayuliang–Goiliang block and the Chaglagam block.

The region is populated by Mishmis, who speak Digaro Mishmi and Kaman Mishmi languages.

Location 
It is 308 km away from Arunachal Pradesh's capital Itanagar, 450 km from Imphal, 515 km from Dispur and 543 km from Shillong.

Nearest railway station is 235 km away at Tinsukia in Assam. Nearest airport is Tezu Airport 100 km away at district headquarter Tezu.

Climate

Transport
It is located on the  proposed Mago-Thingbu to Vijaynagar Arunachal Pradesh Frontier Highway along the McMahon Line, alignment map of which can be seen here and here.

See also

 North-East Frontier Agency
 List of people from Arunachal Pradesh
 Religion in Arunachal Pradesh
 Cuisine of Arunachal Pradesh
 List of institutions of higher education in Arunachal Pradesh

References 

Villages in Anjaw district